Maria Antoniou (born 8 December 1964 in Hägersten) is a Swedish actress.

Filmography
1988 - Vargens tid
2002 - Bella bland kryddor och kriminella
2003–2007 - Tusenbröder
2006 - Tusenbröder – Återkomsten
2008 - Livet i Fagervik

References

External links

Living people
20th-century Swedish actresses
1964 births
Actresses from Stockholm